Middletown–Town of Walkill station, often just referred to as the Middletown station, is a stop on the Metro-North Railroad's Port Jervis Line serving the city of Middletown and the town of Wallkill in Orange County, New York. The station is located in the latter municipality along the former Erie Railroad Graham Line. Two trains end at the station on weekdays, with one of them turning back for service to Hoboken. The station contains an elevated platform for access by passengers in wheelchairs, and expanded paid parking. In a switch from the other stations to receive these amenities, the platform roof at Middletown is green rather than red, platform light poles are brown instead of green and the wheelchair platform is not under the roof. While other Metro-North stations such as Cortlandt and Southeast are named after the towns in which they are located, the station is the only one to include "Town of ..." in its official name, to avoid longstanding confusion with the nearby hamlet in Ulster County.

The station replaced the former Erie Railroad station on James Street in Middletown, which maintained service from May 26, 1843 to April 15, 1983. That building now serves as the Thrall Library.  Middletown–Town of Walkill station opened on April 18, 1983.

Station layout
The station has one track and a low-level side platform.

References

External links 

Metro-North Railroad stations in New York (state)
Railway stations in Orange County, New York
Middletown, Orange County, New York
NJ Transit Rail Operations stations
Railway stations in the United States opened in 1983
1983 establishments in New York (state)